Kahlil Edward Bell (born December 10, 1986) is a former American football running back. He played college football at UCLA. Bell was signed by the Minnesota Vikings as an undrafted free agent in 2009. He was also played for the Chicago Bears, New York Jets and Green Bay Packers.

Professional career

Minnesota Vikings
Bell was signed by the Minnesota Vikings as an undrafted free agent on April 27, 2009. He was waived on August 16, 2009.

Chicago Bears
Bell was signed to the Chicago Bears' practice squad on September 16, 2009. He was promoted from the practice squad to the active roster on November 20, 2009, to replace an injured Garrett Wolfe.

His first NFL carry on November 22, 2009 was a 72-yard run against the Philadelphia Eagles on NBC Sunday Night Football. This was an NFL record for longest first carry of a career at the time. Jalen Richard of the Oakland Raiders first ever NFL carry, on September 11, 2016, against the New Orleans Saints, was a 75-yard Touchdown run, and is the current record. His first NFL touchdown catch was a 25-yard reception against the Seattle Seahawks on December 18, 2011.

In 2011, after an injury to Matt Forté and Marion Barber, Bell became the starting running back for the Week 16 and 17 games against the Green Bay Packers and Minnesota Vikings after beating out undrafted rookie Armando Allen.  Bell also played in the Bears loss against the Denver Broncos. Bell and backup quarterback Josh McCown both generated more than 400 yards in the Packers game. Bell would record 121 on 23 attempts, and caught 4 passes for 38 yards.

In 2012, Bell became an unrestricted free agent, and the Bears extended a qualifying offer to him, which he accepted on April 14, 2012. The contract was worth one-year and $1.26 million. He was waived on August 23, 2012 when he refused to have his contract reduced to $700,000. He was re-signed by the Bears on September 15, 2012 after starting running back Matt Forte went down with an injury. Bell was later waived on October 15.

New York Jets
Bell was signed by the New York Jets on November 13, 2012 following injuries to running backs Bilal Powell and Joe McKnight. He was waived on December 11, 2012.

Second stint with the Chicago Bears
On December 18, 2012, Bell was brought back by the Bears after Michael Bush was placed on injured reserve.

Second stint with the New York Jets
On August 11, 2013, Bell was signed by the New York Jets after running back John Griffin was waived due to a broken leg. He was released on September 1, 2013.

Green Bay Packers

On December 2, 2013, Bell was signed by the Green Bay Packers. He was not re-signed at the end of the season, making him a free agent.

Professional wrestling career
Bell participated in season 6 of WWE Tough Enough. Although he initially was part of the 13 official participants, he didn't pass the medical evaluations and was eliminated from the contest.

Personal life
Born in Santa Rosa, California and raised in San Anselmo, California, Bell is of Samoan and African American descent. After football, Bell returned to UCLA, and completed his degree in History, which he earned in spring 2017.

References

External links
 Chicago Bears bio
 UCLA Bruins bio

1986 births
Living people
American sportspeople of Samoan descent
People from San Anselmo, California
Sportspeople from Santa Rosa, California
Players of American football from California
American football running backs
UCLA Bruins football players
Minnesota Vikings players
Chicago Bears players
New York Jets players
Green Bay Packers players
Tough Enough contestants